Paulo Frischknecht (born 7 June 1961) is a Portuguese former freestyle and butterfly swimmer. He competed at the 1976 Summer Olympics and the 1980 Summer Olympics.

References

External links
 

1961 births
Living people
Portuguese male butterfly swimmers
Portuguese male freestyle swimmers
Olympic swimmers of Portugal
Swimmers at the 1976 Summer Olympics
Swimmers at the 1980 Summer Olympics
People from Tomar
Sportspeople from Santarém District

Portuguese people of German descent